Igor Crnadak (born 28 July 1972) is a Bosnian Serb politician who served as Minister of Foreign Affairs from 2015 to 2019. He is currently a member of the National Assembly of Republika Srpska. 

Crnadak is also a member of the Party of Democratic Progress.

Early life and education
Coming from a Bosnian Serb family, Crnadak was born in Zadar and attended high school in Banja Luka. In 2004, he graduated from the Faculty of Economics at the University of Banja Luka.

Political career
In his early career, Crnadak worked as journalist, anchor, producer and radio editor and wrote for numerous printed media. He worked as an anchor at a private radio in Banja Luka during the Bosnian War. Between 1996 and 1998, he was a correspondent for the Voice of America based in Banja Luka. 

Since 1999, Crnadak has been a member of the Party of Democratic Progress (PDP) and has held numerous positions within the party. From 2000 to 2004, he was head of the PDP in the City Assembly of Banjaluka. He was a member of the European Integration Committee of the National Assembly of Republika Srpska in 2006. Since 2011, Crnadak has been Secretary General of the PDP.

From 2007 until 2009, he was Deputy Minister of Defence and was responsible for the Bosnian NATO Coordination Team. On 31 March 2015, Crnadak was appointed Minister of Foreign Affairs. His term as Minister ended on 23 December 2019.

Personal life
Igor is married to Đurđica Crnadak and is a father of two children. He speaks English fluently. Crnadak is well known to suffer from strabismus.

See also
List of foreign ministers in 2015
List of foreign ministers in 2016
List of foreign ministers in 2017
List of foreign ministers in 2018
List of foreign ministers in 2019

References

External links
 
Is Bosnia and Herzegovina ready for the EU? Igor Crnadak at BBC Hard Talk

1972 births
Living people
Politicians from Zadar
Serbs of Croatia
Serbs of Bosnia and Herzegovina
University of Banja Luka alumni
Politicians of Republika Srpska
Party of Democratic Progress politicians
Foreign ministers of Bosnia and Herzegovina